The term mud shrimp is used for a number of different mud-dwelling crustaceans:
Infraorder Thalassinidea, including genera such as Callianassa, Pestarella and Upogebia
Corophium volutator, an amphipod of the North Atlantic
Species of Solenocera, a genus of prawns

Animal common name disambiguation pages